 

Elysian Valley, commonly known as Frogtown, is a neighborhood in Central Los Angeles, California, adjoining the Los Angeles River. It has two parks, both maintained by the Mountains Recreation and Conservation Authority (MRCA). The Frogtown Art Walk is a biennial event managed by the Elysian Valley Arts Collective to celebrate local area artists. Knightsbridge Theatre is a repertory theater company located in the neighborhood.

History 

In the late 1800s and early 1900s, Elysian Valley was home to a number of farms. These farmers carted their produce down the road to sell in the markets of downtown Los Angeles and emerging suburbs like Angelino Heights.  In 1910, the city annexed the farmland.  In 1911, Southern Pacific Railroad’s Taylor Yard was built just across the river. In 1913, the land started being subdivided for residential development.

Sometime between the 1930s and 1960s, the neighborhood became known as Frogtown when swarms of western toads invaded its streets.
In 1962, the Golden State Freeway removed a section of the western flank of Frogtown, further isolating it from nearby neighborhoods.

Michael Todd, one of the unofficial founding fathers of the Frogtown art scene, has had a studio in the neighborhood since the mid-1980s.
By 2014, artists Shepard Fairey, Mark Grohjahn and Thomas Houseago had opened studios in the community.

In July 2019, it was reported that Frogtown was undergoing "inexorable change" due to gentrification. With the announcement of a $1 billion restoration project for the Los Angeles River, also known as Alternative 20, many residents felt the pressure of new investment and development in the community, causing them to organize for lower density. This push for low density from within the neighborhood is not new and was documented in an article as far back as 1987.

Geography

According to the Mapping L.A. project of the Los Angeles Times, Elysian Valley is bounded by the Los Angeles River on the north and east, Riverside Drive on the west and Fletcher Drive on the northwest.

The neighborhood is flanked on the north by Atwater Village, on the northeast and east by Glassell Park, on the southeast by Cypress Park, on the south and southwest by Elysian Park and on the west and northwest by Echo Park and Silver Lake.

Population
The 2000 U.S. census counted 7,387 residents in the 0.79-square-mile neighborhood—an average of 9,354 people per square mile, about the same population density as the rest of the city. In 2008 the city estimated that the population had increased to 7,781. The median age for residents was 31, about average for Los Angeles, but the percentage of residents aged 11 to 18 was among the county's highest.

The neighborhood is moderately diverse ethnically, and the percentage of Asians and Latinos is comparatively high. The breakdown in 2000 was Latinos, 61.0%; Asians, 35.9%; whites, 9.7%; blacks, 1.1%,  and others, and 2.6%.  Mexico was the most common places of birth for the 47.5% of the residents who were born abroad, a high figure compared to rest of the city.

The median yearly household income in 2008 dollars was $49,013, about the same as the rest of Los Angeles. The average household size of 3.4 people was high for the city of Los Angeles. Renters occupied 52.2% of the housing stock, and house- or apartment owners 47.8%.

Seventeen percent of the neighborhood residents aged 25 and older had earned a four-year degree by 2000, an average figure for the city.

Education
Los Angeles Unified School District has one school within Elysian Valley:

 Dorris Place Elementary - 2225 Dorris Place.

Landmarks and attractions

 Knightsbridge Theatre - 1944 Riverside Drive. Formerly the Colony Theater, Knightsbridge Theatre is home to a repertory theater company with a second location in Pasadena.
 Suay Sew Shop - 2915 Knox Ave #105. A sustainable clothing and accessory company.

Events
 Frogtown Art Walk - a biennial event to celebrate local area artists. It draws thousands of visitors to the neighborhood.

Parks and recreation

Elysian Valley has two parks, both maintained by the Mountains Recreation and Conservation Authority (MRCA).
 Egret Park - The park features a viewpoint, native plantings, and interpretive displays along with access to the Los Angeles River Bike Path.
 Steelhead Park - The park has a small outdoor amphitheater for education.  Steelhead trout adorn the top of the park's wrought iron fencing.
Rattlesnake Park - The park has an entrance off Fletcher Drive, south of the LA River.

In media
According to the Los Angeles Times, Dorris Place Elementary is "probably the most filmed elementary school in the United States." With elegant brick work and dark wood trim, the school has an "east coast" appearance. In the 1985-86 school year, the school was used for commercials for Purina, the California Lottery, the Church of Jesus Christ of Latter-day Saints, Burger King, the National Education Assn. and Kleenex. Over that time, Dorris Place received $4,400 from filmmakers. The money was used to buy computers, software and basketball uniforms. The school's facade has appeared in Cold Case, Freaky Friday, Unlawful Entry, and Lucifer.

Religion
Religious congregations include:
	
 St. Ann Catholic Parish - 2302 Riverdale Avenue
 St. Mary Coptic Catholic Church - 2701 Newell Avenue
 Kadampa Meditation Center - 1492 Blake Avenue

References

External links
 Mapping Frogtown: Elysian Valley (Video)
  Elysian Valley crime map and statistics

Neighborhoods in Los Angeles
Central Los Angeles
Northwest Los Angeles
Filipino-American culture in California
Asian-American culture in Los Angeles